Eduard Karlovich Brandt (  15 February 1839 – 17 November 1891) was a Russo-German comparative anatomist and zoologist who contributed to studies on the nervous system of insects. He served as a professor at the Imperial Military Medical Academy in St. Petersburg.

Life and work 
Brandt was educated at St. Petersburg where he studied at the Saint Peter's School after which he studied medicine, receiving a diploma in 1862. He then studied zoology, training under his uncle Fedor Fedorovich Brandt (German form Johann Friedrich von Brandt), particularly examining the insects and received a master's degree in 1876. In 1863 he became an assistant in comparative anatomy at the Imperial Military Medical Academy. He made field trips in Paris with Émile Blanchard and Henri Milne-Edwards in 1866 and met Richard Owen in London. He became a professor of zoology in 1878 and was elected to the Academy of Sciences Leopoldina in 1881. His major work was on the nervous system of insects for which he received an award from the French Academy of Sciences.  Between 1880 and 1889 he presided over the Russian Entomological Society.

References

External links 
 Brandt's studies on the nervous system of insects in Horae Societatis Entomologicae Rossicae (1879)

1891 deaths
1839 births
Russian anatomists
Entomologists from the Russian Empire
Academic staff of the S.M. Kirov Military Medical Academy